Mahabalipuram Lighthouse is located in Tamil Nadu, India. It has been open to tourists since 2011. It was closed in 2001 following a perceived threat from the Liberation Tigers of Tamil Eelam. The first light was commissioned here in 1887 on the roof of the Olakkannesvara Temple. The lighthouse, with a circular masonry tower made of natural stone, became fully functional in 1904. India's oldest lighthouse, built around 640 CE by Pallava king Mahendravarman I stands next to this modern structure. The Pallava era lighthouse is a protected monument, maintained by the Archaeological Survey of India.

Olakkannesvara Temple 

Mahabalipuram was a busy port under the Pallavas as early as the 7th century CE. Bonfires were lit on rocks even at that time to aid the mariners. The British first used the temple atop the Mahishasuramardini cave as a light. The new lighthouse and the old lighthouse are adjacent to each other.

A granite roof was constructed atop the temple to keep the light from 1887 to 1900.

See also 

 Chennai Lighthouse
 List of lighthouses in India

References

External links 
 
 Directorate General of Lighthouses and Lightships
 http://mahabalipuramlighthouse.com
 More Details Available at TourismTN

Lighthouses in Tamil Nadu
Mahabalipuram
Lighthouses completed in 1900
1900 establishments in India